Pamela Tulizo is a documentary photographer and journalist, born in 1994 in Bukavu in North Kivu, Democratic Republic of the Congo. In 2020, she won the Dior Photography and Visual Arts Award for Young Talents.

Biography 
Pamela Tulizo was born in 1994. She was raised in Goma, in the eastern region of the Democratic Republic of Congo. She is a journalist by training and a 2019 graduate of the Market Photo Workshop in Johannesburg. She was trained by the artist Martin Lukongo, and lives and works in Goma.

Career 
Tulizio began her career as a journalist before turning to photography as an artistic pursuit. Her subject matter raises awareness of Congolese women, their inner strength and resilience, despite the political, ecological, and economic instability of her region in Eastern Congo. Often seen as victims, particularly of sexual violence, the women from Goma she portrays in her photographs are clearly powerful individuals in the fight for social justice.

Exhibitions 
Selective list

 2019: Double Identité Lubumbashi Biennial
 2022: Face to Face, Maison européene de la photographie, Paris, from January 21 to March 13

Awards 
 2020: Dior Photography and Visual Arts Award for Young Talents for her series, “Double identity"

References

External links 

1994 births
Democratic Republic of the Congo women photographers
Living people
21st-century women photographers
People from Bukavu